The Kells Blackwater, also called the River Blackwater or Leinster Blackwater, is a river that flows through the counties of Cavan and Meath in Ireland. It is a tributary of the River Boyne which flows into the Irish Sea at Drogheda. (This is one of two River Blackwaters which flow into the Boyne in County Meath, the other originates in County Kildare).

It has its source in the south of County Cavan, near the town of Bailieborough. It flows through Lough Ramor at Virginia, County Cavan, past Kells, County Meath, before joining the River Boyne in Navan, County Meath.

See also
Rivers of Ireland

References

External links
Kells Anglers Association includes river's insect life

Rivers of County Cavan
Rivers of County Meath